Bolshaya Knyazevka is a rural locality (a selo) in Alexandrovskoye Rural Settlement, Zhirnovsky District, Volgograd Oblast, Russia. The population was 139 as of 2010. There are six streets.

Geography 
Bolshaya Knyazevka is on the right bank of the Medveditsa River, 25 km north of Zhirnovsk (the district's administrative centre) by road. Novaya Bakhmetyevka is the nearest rural locality.

References 

Rural localities in Zhirnovsky District